Loch Bowie is a small freshwater loch located in West Dunbartonshire, Scotland.

Geography
The town of Dumbarton is directly to the west. To the south is Dumbuck Hill, which is now Dumbuckhill Quarry. To the southeast is the Chapel of Colquhoun. The mound is from a volcanic plug on the edge of the Kilpatrick Hills plateau called Chapel Knowe. In the centre of the mound there is the appearance of the foundations of a small building, and in earlier times was used as a place of sepulture. A tradition is held amongst people in Dumbarton that a chapel formerly stood on the mound that part of the walls from about 100 years ago remained. Within this century, tombstones have been excavated from the ground on the Chapel Knowe. Chapel Knowe nor Muir of Colquhoun has not been found on any plan. Closer to the east, is the former castle of Middleton Castle that later became a farm.

To the north along the rural road that passes the loch to the right is Overtoun House.

Gallery

See also
 List of lochs in Scotland
 List of reservoirs and dams in the United Kingdom

References

Freshwater lochs of Scotland